Vicente Marcelo Gatica Grandón (born 11 February 1996) is a Chilean footballer that currently plays as a forward.

Career
In the beginning of 2020, Gatica joined CD Comunal Cabrero.

References

External links
 

1996 births
Living people
Chilean footballers
Chilean Primera División players
C.D. Huachipato footballers
Ñublense footballers
Independiente de Cauquenes footballers
Association football forwards
People from Talcahuano